The Lesson of the Master is a novella written by Henry James, originally published in  1888.

Plot summary 
The novella tells the story of a young writer, Paul Overt, who meets Henry St. George, a famous novelist Overt admires. During that time, Overt also meets and falls in love with Marian Fancourt, a young woman who admires both St. George's and Overt's work. During their meetings, St. George, who is married, advises Overt against getting married and having children, arguing that a wife and children will be the death of Overt's creativity and career. Overt then takes an extended vacation in which he considers St. George's advice. When he returns, he learns that St. George's wife had died and that St. George and Marian Fancourt had become engaged. Overt feels that St. George had set him up in order to have Miss Fancourt for himself, but St. George insists that by marrying her, he saved Overt and his career.

Cultural references
Guardian writer Jonathan Jones reflecting on the "art of politics" and Boris Johnson, references the story in October 2015:
 In Henry James’s story The Lesson of the Master a writer must choose between the perfection of art and the seductive compromises of real life.

References

External links
 

1888 short stories
Short stories by Henry James
American novellas